Lalueza is a municipality in the province of Huesca, Aragon, Spain. According to the 2004 census (INE), the municipality has a population of 1,140 inhabitants.

Geography
The nearest towns are Orillena, Sodeto, Marcén, and San Lorenzo del Flumen last one is also, with Marcén, a neighborhood part of the wonderful Lalueza City (center of the universe).

References

Municipalities in the Province of Huesca